This is a list of Saudi Arabia women's international footballers – association football players who have appeared at least once for the senior Saudi Arabia women's national football team.

Players

See also 
 List of Saudi Arabia international footballers
 Saudi Arabia women's national football team results

References 

 
Lists of Saudi Arabia international footballers
Association football player non-biographical articles
Saudi Arabia
international footballers